Hoti is Albanian surname derived from the Hoti tribe in northern Albania. It is found mainly in northern Albania Montenegro and Kosovo. Notable people with the surname include:

 Avdullah Hoti (1976-present), Prime Minister of Kosovo
Junç Hoti (1434), capitaneus montanee Ottorum (captain of the mountains of Hoti)
 Ilir Hoti (1957-2016), Albanian economist and university teacher
 Fortesa Hoti (born 1988), Swedish actress
 Ukshin Hoti (1943-1999), Albanian philosopher and activist
 Semanta Hoti (1991-present), International lawyer

References 

Albanian-language surnames